This page lists notable alumni and students of the University of California, Berkeley. Alumni who also served as faculty are listed in bold font, with degree and year.

Notable faculty members are in the article List of UC Berkeley faculty.

Royalty

Princess Laurentien of the Netherlands (Laurentien Brinkhorst), M.Jour. 1991 – Princess of Orange-Nassau, Netherlands; wife of Prince Constantijn of the Netherlands and daughter of the Dutch minister of Economic Affairs, Laurens-Jan Brinkhorst and Jantien Brinkhorst-Heringa
Prince Johan-Friso of Orange-Nassau (attended College of Engineering 1986–1988) – Prince of Orange-Nassau, Netherlands; second son of Queen Beatrix of the Netherlands and Prince Claus von Amsberg
Haakon Magnus, Crown Prince of Norway, B.A. 1999 – heir to the throne of Norway

Heads of state or government

Pedro Nel Ospina Vázquez, B.A. 1882 – President of Colombia (1922–1926)
Francisco I. Madero (attended 1892–1893) – President of Mexico (1911–1913)
Sun Fo, B.A. 1916 – Premier of the Republic of China, president of National Chiao Tung University, chairman of the board of trustees of Soochow University
Zulfikar Ali Bhutto, B.A. 1950 – President of Pakistan (1971–1973), Prime Minister of Pakistan (1973–1977), father of Benazir Bhutto
Miguel Ángel Rodríguez, M.A. 1966, Ph.D. 1966 – President of Costa Rica (1998–2002)
Andrej Bajuk, M.S. 1972 – Prime Minister of Slovenia
Ruhakana Rugunda, M.S. 1977 – Prime Minister of Uganda

Governors
Edmund G. Brown Jr., B.A. 1961 – Governor of California 
C.C. Young, B.L. 1892 – Governor of California
James H. Budd, A.B. 1873 – Governor of California 
John Morton Eshleman, B.A. 1903, M.A. 1905 – Lieutenant Governor of California (1915–1916)
John Garamendi, BA 1966 – Lieutenant Governor of California (2007–2009) 
Neil Goldschmidt, J.D. 1967 – Governor of Oregon (1987–1991)
Walter A. Gordon, B.A. 1918, J.D. 1922 – University of California's first All-American, first African American graduate of Berkeley Law, Governor of the United States Virgin Islands, Federal District Judge, member of National Football Foundation Hall of Fame
Jennifer Granholm, B.A. 1984, J.D. – Governor of Michigan (2003–2011), first woman to hold this position in the state of Michigan; instructor at UC Berkeley after her governorship 
Richard Lamm, J.D. 1961 – Governor of Colorado (1975–1987)
Sione Manu'uli Luani – Governor of Vava'u, Tonga (2009–2010)
James Soong, M.A. 1967 – Governor of Taiwan Province
Earl Warren, B.A. 1912, LL.B. 1914 –  Attorney General of California, 1939–1943; Governor of California, 1943–1953; 14th Chief Justice of the United States Supreme Court from 1953 to 1969 
Pete Wilson, J.D. 1962 – U.S. Senator, Governor of California 
George C. Pardee, (attended 1903–1907) – Governor of California  
Hiram W. Johnson, (attended 1911–1917) – Governor of California and US Senator (1917–1945)
Ridwan Kamil, M.U.D. 2001 – Governor of West Java, Indonesia

Executive council members

The following served as cabinet-level officials.

Jerome Adams, M.P.H. 2000 – Surgeon General of the United States
Andrej Bajuk, M.S. 1972 – Minister of Finance of the Republic of Slovenia, Prime Minister of Slovenia (May–November 2000)
Ruhakana Rugunda, M.S. 1977 – Prime Minister of the Republic of Uganda
Sandra Black, BA 1991 – member  of the White House Council of Economic Advisers 
W. Michael Blumenthal, B.S. 1951 – United States Secretary of the Treasury (1977–1979)
Michael Boskin, B.A. 1967, Ph.D. 1971 – chair, Presidential Council of Economic Advisors, professor at Stanford University
Mostafa Chamran, PhD 1963 – former Iranian minister of defense
Prithviraj Chavan M.S. 1967 – Chief Minister of the Indian state of Maharashtra, Member of Parliament in the Rajya Sabha (India's Upper house of Parliament), currently a Minister of State in the prime minister's Office, Government of India
Steven Chu, PhD 1976, United States Secretary of Energy (2009–2013)
Lydia Dunn, Baroness Dunn, B.S. 1964 – Life peer in the House of Lords (1990–present); senior unofficial member of the Hong Kong Legislative Council (1985–1988); senior unofficial member of the Hong Kong Executive Council (1988–1995); non-executive deputy chairman of HSBC (1992–2008)
Laura Giuliano,  PhD 2003 – adviser to White House Council of Economic Advisers
Neil Goldschmidt, J.D. 1967 – United States Secretary of Transportation (1979–1981)
Judith Heumann, M.P.H. 1975 – pioneer for disability rights and former Assistant United States Secretary of Education
Raffi Hovannisian, 1977 (attended) – former Foreign Minister of Armenia
Dorodjatun Kuntjoro-Jakti, M.A. 1966, Ph.D 1980 – former coordinating minister for economic affairs of the Republic of Indonesia; former Indonesian ambassador to the United States
Franklin Lane, 1887 – United States Secretary of the Interior (1913 to 1920), Interstate Commerce Commission (1905–1913), 1902 Democratic nominee for Governor of California
Robert McNamara, B.A. 1937 – president of World Bank (1968–1981), United States Secretary of Defense (1961–1968), president of Ford Motor Company (1960)
G. William Miller, J.D. 1952 – United States Secretary of the Treasury (1979–1981), Chairman of the Federal Reserve (1978–1979)
Norman Mineta, B.S. 1953 – Congressman (D-California) (1975–1995), United States Secretary of Transportation (2001–2006), United States Secretary of Commerce (2000–2001)
Widjojo Nitisastro, PhD 1961 – former Indonesian Minister for Economy, Finance and Industry
Rodrigo Rato, M.B.A. 1974 – Spain's former minister of economy, managing director of International Monetary Fund (IMF) (2004–2007)
Jesse Rothstein, PhD – senior economist for the White House Council of Economic Advisers
Dean Rusk (studied law, Class of 1940) – United States Secretary of State (1961–1969)
Robert Seamans, PhD – adviser to White House Council of Economic Advisers
Jay Shambaugh, PhD 2002 –  member  of the White House Council of Economic Advisers
James Stock, M.A. 1982, PhD 1983 – member of the  White House Council of Economic Advisers
Ann Veneman, M.P.P. 1971 – United States Secretary of Agriculture (2001–2005); executive director of UNICEF (2005–present)

Judges

Robert Aguilar, B.A., 1954, J.D., 1958 – judge, U.S. District Court for the Northern District of California
Richard G. Andrews, J.D., 1981 – judge, U.S. District Court for the District of Delaware
Stanley Barnes, A.B., 1924, J.D., 1927 – judge, U.S. Court of Appeals for the Ninth Circuit
Marsha Berzon, J.D., 1973 – judge, U.S. Court of Appeals for the Ninth Circuit
Rose Bird, J.D., 1965 – first female chief justice of the California Supreme Court 
Charles R. Breyer, J.D., 1966 – judge, U.S. District Court for the Northern District of California
Allen Broussard, B.A., 1950, J.D., 1953 – associate justice of the California Supreme Court 
Lloyd Hudson Burke, LL.B., 1940 – judge, U.S. District Court for the Northern District of California
Edward M. Chen, B.A., 1975, J.D., 1979 – judge, U.S. District Court for the Northern District of California
Maxine M. Chesney, B.A., 1964, J.D., 1967 – judge, U.S. District Court for the Northern District of California
Vince Girdhari Chhabria, J.D., 1998 – judge, U.S. District Court for the Northern District of California
William Perry Copple, B.A., 1948, J.D., 1951 – judge, U.S. District Court for the District of Arizona
Myron Donovan Crocker, LL.B., 1940 – judge, U.S. District Court for the Southern District of California, Eastern District of California
Frank C. Damrell Jr., B.A., 1961 – judge, U.S. District Court for the Eastern District of California
George B. Daniels, J.D., 1978 – judge, U.S. District Court for the Southern District of New York
William Denman, B.Litt., 1894 – judge, U.S. Court of Appeals for the Ninth Circuit
James Donato, B.A. 1983 – judge, U.S. District Court for the Northern District of California
Joan Donoghue, J.D. 1978 – judge, International Court of Justice
Miranda Du, J.D., 1994 – judge, U.S. District Court for the District of Nevada
Herbert Wilson Erskine, A.B., 1908 – judge, U.S. District Court for the Northern District of California
Michael W. Fitzgerald, J.D., 1985 – judge, U.S. District Court for the Central District of California
Beth Labson Freeman, B.A., 1976 – judge, U.S. District Court for the Northern District of California
Monroe Mark Friedman, A.B., 1916, LL.B., 1920 – judge, U.S. District Court for the Northern District of California
Lloyd D. George, J.D., 1961 – judge, U.S. District Court for the District of Nevada
Steven Gonzalez, J.D., 1991 – associate justice, Washington Supreme Court
Louis Earl Goodman, B.A., 1913 – judge, U.S. District Court for the Northern District of California
Sherrill Halbert, A.B., 1924, J.D., 1927 – judge, U.S. District Court for the Northern District of California
Oliver Deveta Hamlin, Jr., B.L., 1914 – judge, U.S. Court of Appeals for the Ninth Circuit, U.S. District Court for the Northern District of California
Thelton Henderson, B.A., 1956, J.D., 1962 – judge, U.S. District Court for the Northern District of California
Harry Aaron Hollzer, B.L., 1902, LL.B., 1903 – judge, U.S. District Court for the Southern District of California
Sandra Segal Ikuta, A.B., 1976 – judge, U.S. Court of Appeals for the Ninth Circuit
Anthony W. Ishii, J.D., 1973 – judge, U.S. District Court for the Eastern District of California
Lance Ito, J.D. 1975 – judge, Los Angeles County Superior Court, presided over O. J. Simpson trial
D. Lowell Jensen, A.B., 1949, LL.B., 1952 – judge, U.S. District Court for the Northern District of California
Alan Cooke Kay, LL.B., 1960 – judge, U.S. District Court for the District of Hawaii
William Duffy Keller, B.S., 1956 – judge, U.S. District Court for the Central District of California
David Vreeland Kenyon, B.A., 1952 – judge, U.S. District Court for the Central District of California
Gerald Sanford Levin, A.B., 1927, LL.D., 1930 – judge, U.S. District Court for the Northern District of California
M. James Lorenz, B.A., 1957 – judge, U.S. District Court for the Southern District of California
Thomas Jamison MacBride, A.B., 1936, J.D., 1940 – judge, U.S. District Court for the Northern District of California, Eastern District of California
Kiyo A. Matsumoto, B.A 1976 – judge, U.S. District Court for the Eastern District of New York
Linda Hodge McLaughlin, LL.B., 1966 – judge, U.S. District Court for the Central District of California
Charles Merton Merrill, A.B., 1928 – judge, U.S. Court of Appeals for the Ninth Circuit
Frank C. Newman, LL.B., 1941 – associate justice, California Supreme Court
Fernando M. Olguin, M.A., J.D., 1989 – judge, U.S. District Court for the Central District of California
Lawrence Joseph O'Neill, B.A., 1973 – judge, U.S. District Court for the Eastern District of California
William Horsley Orrick, Jr., LL.B., 1941 – judge, U.S. District Court for the Northern District of California
John B. Owens, B.A., 1993 – judge, U.S. Court of Appeals for the Ninth Circuit
Richard Paez, J.D., 1972 – judge, U.S. Court of Appeals for the Ninth Circuit, U.S. District Court for the Central District of California
John Slater Partridge, A.B., 1892, A.M., 1894 – judge, U.S. District Court for the Northern District of California
Virginia A. Phillips, J.D., 1982 – judge, U.S. District Court for the Central District of California
Harry Pregerson, LL.B., 1950 – judge, U.S. Court of Appeals for the Ninth Circuit, U.S. District Court for the Central District of California
Edward Dean Price, A.B., 1947, LL.B., 1949 – judge, U.S. District Court for the Eastern District of California
Jane A. Restani, B.A., 1969 – judge, U.S. Court of International Trade
Cruz Reynoso, LL.B., 1958 – first Latino Associate Justice of the California Supreme Court
Edward Joseph Schwartz, A.B., 1934 – judge, U.S. District Court for the Southern District of California
Milton Lewis Schwartz, A.B., 1941, J.D., 1948 – judge, U.S. District Court for the Eastern District of California
William B. Shubb, A.B., 1960, J.D., 1963 – judge, U.S. District Court for the Eastern District of California
James Keith Singleton, Jr., A.B., 1961, LL.B., 1964 – judge, U.S. District Court for the District of Alaska
Indira Talwani, J.D., 1988 – judge, U.S. District Court for the District of Massachusetts
Amul Thapar, J.D., 1994 – judge, U.S. District Court for the Eastern District of Kentucky
Jon S. Tigar, J.D., 1989 – judge, U.S. District Court for the Northern District of California
Roger J. Traynor, B.A. 1923, Ph.D. 1926, J.D. 1927 – Chief Justice of the California Supreme Court (1964–1970)
John P. Vukasin Jr., A.B., 1950, J.D., 1956 – judge, U.S. District Court for the Northern District of California
John Clifford Wallace, LL.B., 1955 – judge, U.S. Court of Appeals for the Ninth Circuit, U.S. District Court for the Southern District of California
Evan Wallach, J.D., 1976 – judge, U.S. Court of Appeals for the Federal Circuit
Oliver Winston Wanger, LL.B., 1966 – judge, U.S. District Court for the Eastern District of California
Earl Warren, B.A. 1912, J.D. 1914 – 14th Chief Justice of the United States Supreme Court (1953–1969) (also listed in Governors section and Attorneys section)
Paul J. Watford, B.A., 1989 – judge, U.S. Court of Appeals for the Ninth Circuit
Kathryn Werdegar, B.A., 1962 – associate justice, California Supreme Court
Francis C. Whelan, LL.B., J.D., 1932 – judge, U.S. District Court for the Central District of California, Southern District of California
Claudia Ann Wilken, J.D., 1975 – judge, U.S. District Court for the Northern District of California
Spencer Mortimer Williams, LL.B., 1948 – judge, U.S. District Court for the Northern District of California
David John Wilson, J.D., 1919 – judge, U.S. Customs Court
Albert Charles Wollenberg, A.B., 1922, J.D., 1924 – judge, U.S. District Court for the Northern District of California
Alfonso Zirpoli, A.B., 1926, J.D., 1928 – judge, U.S. District Court for the Northern District of California

Legislators

Dick Ackerman, B.A. 1964 – former California State Senate Republican Leader
 Katherine B. Aguon – Guamanian educator and politician. 
Colin Allred, J.D. 2014  – Congressman (D-Texas) (2018–present)
Sam Blakeslee, B.S., M.S. – California State Senator and former California State Assembly Republican Leader
Robert Campbell, M.A. 1964 – former member of the state Assembly (D-Richmond) (1980–1996)
Stephen W. Cunningham – first UCLA graduate manager and Los Angeles City Council member, 1933–41
Susan Davis, B.A. 1965 – Congresswoman (D-CA) (2001–present) 
Ron Dellums, M.S.W. 1962 – Congressman 
Vernon Ehlers, Ph.D. 1960 – Congressman (R-Michigan) (1993–2011)
John A. Elston, 1897 – Congressman (P and R-California) (1915–1921)
Jesse Gabriel, California State Assemblyman
John Garamendi, B.S. 1966 – Congressman (D-California) (2009–present) 
Craig Hosmer, B.A. 1937 – Congressman (D-California) (1953–1974) 
Crystal Brilliant Snow Jenne – member of the Alaska Territorial House of Representatives (1940–1944)
William F. Knowland, B.A. 1929 – US Senator (R-California) (1945–1959); US Senate Majority Leader (1953–1955) US Senate Minority Leader (1955–1959) 
Tom Lantos, Ph.D 1953 – Congressman (D-California) (1981–2008) 
Mohammad Javad Larijani, Ph.D. – former Member of Parliament, Iran
Barbara Lee, M.S.W. 1975 – Congresswoman (D-Oakland) (1998–present) 
Mel Levine, B.A. 1964 – Congressman (D-California) (1983–1993) 
Doris Matsui, B.A. 1966 – Congresswoman (D-California) replacing her deceased husband, Robert Matsui 
Robert Matsui, B.A. 1963 – Congressman (D-California) (1993–2005) 
Cynthia McKinney, Ph.D. candidate – Congresswoman (D-Georgia) (1997–2007) 
Norman Mineta, B.S. 1953 – Congressman (D-California) (1975–1995), United States Secretary of Transportation (2001–2006), United States Secretary of Commerce (2000–2001) 
Dan K. Morhaim, B.A. 1970 – Maryland legislator
Nicole Parra, B.A. 1992 – California state Assemblywoman (2002–present)
Ira Ruskin, B.A. 1968 – Democratic California State Assemblyman (21 Assembly District) (2004–present)
Linda Sánchez, B.A. 1991 – Congresswoman (2002–present) 
Dalip Singh Saund, M.A. 1922, Ph.D. 1924 – first Indian American Congressman (D-California) (1957–1963), mathematician
Peter F. Schabarum, B.S. 1951 – California state Assemblyman (1966–1972), Los Angeles County Board of Supervisors (1972–1991)
Todd Spitzer, M.P.P. 1989 – California State Assemblyman
Roy A. Vitousek, B.S. 1912 – Member of the Hawaii Territorial House of Representatives from 1922 to 1944; Speaker of the House 1931–1932, 1935–1940, and 1943–1944
Peter Welch, J.D. 1973 – Congressman (D-Vermont) (2006–present)

Directors

Basim Elkarra – director of Sacramento Chapter of Council on American-Islamic Relations; civil rights leader; serves on the Executive Board of the California Democratic Party; former board member of the Sacramento chapter of the American Civil Liberties Union; member of Twin Rivers Unified School District Board of Trustees
Horace Albright, B.A. 1912 – conservationist, helped establish the National Park Service (with Stephen Mather, Class of 1887), second director of the National Park Service, awarded the Medal of Freedom
Harvey Oren Banks, Ph.D. 1964 – State Engineer of California (1955), first director of the California Department of Water Resources (1956–1961)
G. Wayne Clough. Ph.D. 1969 – 12th Secretary of the Smithsonian Institution (2008–present); former president of Georgia Tech (see above)
James P. Cooper, B.A. 1980 – first director of quality assurance, Office of Finance, United States House of Representatives (2020-present)
Nicolle Devenish, B.A. 1994 – White House Communications Director (2004–2006)
Newton B. Drury, B.A. 1912 – conservationist, fourth director of the National Park Service
Julie Gerberding, M.P.H. 1990 – director of the Centers for Disease Control (2002–2009)
Stephen Mather, 1887 – conservationist, founding director of the National Park Service
John McCone, B.S. 1922 – director of the Central Intelligence Agency (CIA) (1961–1965)
Marc Pachter, B.A. 1964 – director of the National Portrait Gallery, Washington, D.C. (2000–2007); acting director of the National Museum of American History, Washington, D.C. (2000–2003)

Mayors

Jesse Arreguín, B.A. 2007 – Mayor of Berkeley, California (2016– Incumbent)
Jerry Brown, B.A. 1961 – Mayor of Oakland (listed under Governors section)
Christopher Cabaldon, B.S. 1987 – Mayor of West Sacramento, California
Cho Soon, Ph.D. 1964 – first elected Mayor of Seoul (1995–1997)
Shirley Dean, B.A. 1956 – Mayor of Berkeley, California (1994–2002)
Bob Holcomb, B.A. 1949 – Longest-serving mayor of San Bernardino, California (1971–1985, 1989–1993)
Kevin Johnson, B.A. 1997 – Mayor of Sacramento, retired professional NBA basketball player
Ed Lee, J.D. 1978 – 43rd mayor of San Francisco, first Asian-American mayor in San Francisco's history
Frank Otis, 1873 Mayor of Alameda, California
Lionel Wilson, B.A. 1938 – first African American Mayor of Oakland, California

Diplomats
J. Christopher Stevens, B.A. 1982, J.D. 1989 – United States Ambassador to Libya (2012)
Earl Anthony Wayne, B.A. 1972 – United States Ambassador to Mexico (2011–present)
Julia Chang Bloch, B.A. 1964 – United States Ambassador to Nepal (1989–1993)
Charles Richard Bowers, B.A. 1966, M.A. 1967 – United States Ambassador to Bolivia (1991–1994)
Martin Brennan, B.A. 1971 – former United States Ambassador to Zambia and Uganda
Kenneth C. Brill, M.B.A. 1973 – United States Ambassador to Cyprus (1996–1999), Ambassador to the International Atomic Energy Agency (2001–04)
Ruth A. Davis, M.S.W. 1968 – United States Ambassador to Benin (1992–1995)
Milton Frank, B.A. 1941 – United States Ambassador to Nepal (1988–89)
John Kenneth Galbraith, M.A. 1932, Ph.D. 1934 – Harvard Professor Emeritus of Economics; United States Ambassador to India
Jeffrey Ross Gunter, A.B. 1983 – United States Ambassador to the Republic of Iceland (2019–2021)
Philip Habib, Ph.D. 1952 – United States Ambassador to South Korea (1971–74), U.S. Special Envoy to the Middle East (1981–1983)
Kathryn Walt Hall, B.A. – United States Ambassador to Austria (1997–2001)
*March Kong Fong Eu, B.S. 1943 – former California Secretary of State, former United States Ambassador to Micronesia, mother of Matt Fong, also a noted Chinese-American politician
Michael G. Kozak, B.A. 1968, J.D. 1971 – United States Ambassador to Belarus (2000–2003)
Joseph Limprecht, Ph.D. 1975 – United States Ambassador to Albania (1999–2002)
John K. Menzies, Ph.D. – United States Ambassador to Bosnia-Herzegovina (1996–1996), current dean of the Whitehead School of Diplomacy at Seton Hall University
Richard Monroe Miles, B.A. 1962 – United States Ambassador to Bulgaria (1999–2002), United States Ambassador to Georgia (2002–2005)
David Dunlop Newsom, B.A. 1938 – United States Ambassador to Indonesia (1974–1977), United States Ambassador to the Philippines (1977–1978), Under Secretary of State for Political Affairs (1978–1981)
Sadako Ogata, Ph.D. 1963 – United Nations High Commissioner for Refugees (1991–2001)
Maurice S. Parker, B.A. 1972 – United States Ambassador to Swaziland (2007–present)
Gregory L. Schulte, B.A. 1980 – Ambassador to the International Atomic Energy Agency (2005–09)
Kenneth D. Taylor, M.B.A. 1959 – Canadian ambassador to Iran (1977–1979) during the Iranian Hostage Crisis, noted for his role in the Canadian Caper which formed the basis of the Academy Award-winning film Argo
Emeline U. Tuita, M.B.A. 1999 – Commercial Consul, Tonga Consulate General in San Francisco (1990–1992), Consul General at Tonga Consulate General in San Francisco (1996–1999), Ambassador of the Kingdom of Tonga to the People's Republic of China (2005–2008)
James David Zellerbach, 1913 – United States Ambassador to Italy
Tonika Sealy-Thompson, MA 2019 – Barbadian ambassador to Brazil

Attorneys

Zoe Baird, B.A. 1974, J.D. 1977 – attorney, President of Markle Foundation; nominated by President Clinton for United States Attorney General post
Melvin Belli, J.D. 1929 – attorney
Lea Brilmayer, B.A. 1970, J.D. 1976 – Professor of Law at Yale Law School
Beth Brinkmann, B.A. 1980 – former assistant to the solicitor general of the U.S. (1993–2001) and a partner in the Washington, D.C. office of Morrison & Foerster
Jerry Brown – California Attorney General (2007–present) (also listed under Governors section)
Melinda Haag, J.D. 1987 – United States Attorney for the Northern District of California (2010– )
Bill Lockyer, B.A. 1965 – California Attorney General (1999–2006)
David M. Louie, J.D. 1970 – Attorney General of Hawaii (2011–2014)
Edwin Meese III, J.D. 1958 – United States Attorney General (1985–1988)
Dale Minami, J.D. 1971 – lead litigator for Fred Korematsu's legal team 
Theodore Olson, J.D. 1965 – United States Solicitor General (2001–2004)
Larry Sonsini, B.A. 1963, J.D. 1966 – chair at leading Silicon Valley law firm Wilson Sonsini Goodrich & Rosati
Michael Tigar, B.A. 1962, J.D. 1966 – prominent litigator whose clients have included the Chicago Seven and Oklahoma City bombing accomplice Terry Nichols; Research Professor of Law at Washington College of Law, American University
Earl Warren, B.A. 1912, J.D. 1914 – Attorney General of California, 1939–1943; 1943–1953 (also listed under Governors section and Justices section)

Military officers

Jerome M. Adams, MPH 2000 – vice admiral, United States Navy
Rawson Bennett II, MSEE – rear admiral, United States Navy
William R. Berkman, BA, JD – general, United States Army; Chief, Army Reserve
Bertram A. Bone, 1917 – brigadier general, United States Marine Corps
Casey W. Coane, 1968 – rear admiral, United States Navy
Robert N. Colwell, BS 1938 – rear admiral, United States Navy
William F. Dean, BA 1922 – major general, United States Army
Kenneth Crawford Dempster, Class of 1940 – major general, United States Air Force
Jimmy Doolittle, 1922 – aviator; lieutenant general, United States Army 
Glen Edwards, BS 1941 – captain, United States Air Force; pilot; engineer; namesake of Edwards Air Force Base 
Susan Escallier, BA – brigadier general, United States Army (Judge Advocate General’s Corps.)
George Fedoroff, BA 1967 – Office of Naval Intelligence Senior Intelligence Officer, Russia
David Goggins, BS 1989 (nuclear and material science engineering) – rear admiral, United States Navy
William C. Groeniger III, Class of 1950 – major general, USMCR
Fletcher Lamkin, MSE – brigadier general, United States Army
Yancy B. Lindsey, 1986 – vice admiral, United States Navy
Harry B. Liversedge, Class of 1917 – brigadier general, United States Marine Corps
Michael I. Neil, LL.B. – brigadier general, United States Marine Corps
Monte Melkonian, BA 1978 – Armenian commander in the First Nagorno-Karabakh War
Robert L. Menist, Class of 1964 – major general, United States Army
Stuart de Jong Menist, Class of 1934 – major general, United States Army
Ellen M. Pawlikowski, PhD 1981 chemical engineering – general, United States Air Force
Don T. Riley, MSCE – major general, deputy commanding general, deputy chief of engineers, U.S. Army Corps of Engineers
Jack A. Rogers, BS chemistry – brigadier general, United States Army
Murrey L. Royar, 1916 – vice admiral, United States Navy
Oliver Prince Smith, 1916 – major general, United States Marine Corps
Orwin Clark Talbott, 1936–39 – lieutenant general, United States Army
Jack Eugene Thomas, MA, PhD – major general, United States Air Force
Robert Thomas, BS, civil engineering – vice admiral, United States Navy
Frederick C. Weyand, 1939 – General; 28th Chief of Staff of the Army (1974–1976)
Kenneth Ray Wheeler, Class of 1939 – vice admiral, United States Navy
Jasper Welch, PhD 1958 – major general, United States Air Force
Joseph Williams Jr. – vice admiral, United States Navy
Arthur Riehl Wilson, BA 1919 – major general, United States Army

Activists
Howard Adams, PhD 1966 – Canadian Metis political activist, author of Prison of Grass: Canada from a Native Point of View
Richard Aoki, B.A. 1968, M.S.W. 1970 – co-founder of the Black Panther Party
Gordon Belcourt – former Executive Director of the Montana-Wyoming Tribal Leaders Council
Joan Blades, B.A. 1977 – political activist, co-founder of liberal political advocacy group MoveOn.org (also listed in Science and technology section)
Betty Friedan (attended psychology graduate program) – feminist activist, author of The Feminine Mystique (1963), founder of the National Women's Political Caucus
George Horse-Capture, B.A. 1974 – Native American activist, museum curator, Plains Indian Museum and the National Museum of the American Indian
David Horowitz, M.A. 1961 – conservative political activist and commentator, founder of the  Center for the Study of Popular Culture
Keith Kerr – military general and gay rights activist
Girindra Mukerji, MS 1907/1908 – early Asian American campus organizer, Indian anti-British activist
James Robertson, 1923 – national chair of the Trotskyist Spartacist League
R.J. Rushdoony, B.A. 1938, M.A. 1940 – prominent author of the Christian Right
Kevin Sabet, B.A. 2001 – prominent anti-drug researcher and advocate, founder of Smart Approaches to Marijuana
Mario Savio (attended) – political activist, key member of Berkeley Free Speech Movement
Carol E. Schatz, B.A., Los Angeles civic leader
Eveline Shen, M.P.H. – executive director and board president of West Coast-based reproductive justice nonprofit, Forward Together 
Andy Spahn, B.A. 1978 – progressive political activist, political and philanthropic consultant for DreamWorks SKG

Other

Damir Arnaut, B.A. 1997, M.A. 1998, J.D. 2002 – Adviser for Legal and Constitutional Affairs to Haris Silajdzic, member of the Presidency of Bosnia and Herzegovina, Bosnia and Herzegovina
Jesse Arreguin, B.A. 2003 – Berkeley City Councilmember (2008–present)
Mario Bergara, PhD 1998 – president of the Central Bank of Uruguay (2008–2013), appointed Minister of Economy and Finance
Bernice Brown, 1928 – First Lady of California, Wife of Governor Pat Brown
Josh Brown, B.A. 2003 – Kitsap County Commissioner, Washington state
Peter Brown, M.A. – at-large Houston City Council Member
Mike Casey, B.A. 1980 – trade union leader
Rachelle Chong, B.A. 1981 – first Asian American Commissioner of the Federal Communications Commission and first Asian American Commissioner of the California Public Utilities Commission
Tarak Nath Das, M.A. 1914 – Indian revolutionary, Indian-American scholar and internationalist
Tony Daysog, B.A. 1989, M.C.P. 1998 – Alameda City Council member (1996–2006) and Alameda Vice Mayor (1998–2000 and 2002–2004)
William Dudley, PhD 1982 – president and CEO of the Federal Reserve Bank of New York (2009–present)
Maria Echaveste, J.D. 1980 – White House Deputy Chief of Staff (1998–2001)
Nadine Burke Harris, B.S. 1996 – first Surgeon General of California
H. Robert Heller, PhD 1965 – governor of the Federal Reserve System and president of VISA USA
Ida Louise Jackson, B.A. 1922, M.A. 1923 – education and public-health pioneer
Ellis O. Knox, B.A. 1922 – civil rights and education activist, first African American PhD (USC) on West Coast, former chairman of NAACP Education Division
Bruno Mégret, M.S. 1974 – French far-right politician, member of the French National Assembly (1986–1988), member of the European Parliament (1989–1999) and candidate in the 2002 French presidential election
Kenneth P. Moritsugu, M.P.H. 1975 – Acting Surgeon General of the United States (August 2006 – September 2007)
Jayaprakash Narayan (attended M.A. program) – Indian freedom fighter, social reformer, politician
Richard Neustadt, B.A. 1939 – political historian and advisor to several U.S. presidents
Troy A. Paredes, B.A. 1992 – Commissioner of the Securities and Exchange Commission
Nick E. Smith, B.A. 2003 – First Deputy Public Advocate, City of New York (2019–present); chair and member of Commission on Labor (2004–2007); member of Housing Advisory Commission (2006–2007), City of Berkeley, CA
Kevin Starr, M.L.S. 1974 – California State Librarian Emeritus
Nicolle Wallace, B.A. 1994 – White House Communications Director for President George W. Bush (2005–2009)

See also
 List of UC Berkeley School of Law alumni
List of UC Berkeley faculty

References

Berkeley alumni in politics and government
Alumni Politics